Chelsea Charms (born March 7, 1976) is a former American big-bust model, internet model, and stripper who is famous for having extremely large breasts.

Biography
Charms has appeared in adult magazines specializing in large breast models. She also has appeared on TV and radio shows. She also has appeared at adult-oriented convention.

During a television interview on the set of This Morning in May 2011, Charms told the hosts of the show that her bust size was currently "164XXX, with each implant weighing 26 pounds". She stated on her website news/blog and FAQ page that number had grown to 40 pounds each. She has stated that the size of her breasts causes her no back pain, and states that she does exercise to strengthen her back.

Charms has had breast augmentation surgery three times. The first augmentation enlarged her to a DD cup, the second to a HH. Both were saline bags. The third surgery implanted the polypropylene string, which has since been abandoned as a common procedure in the United States and the European Union because of the potentially unlimited growth side effect, but has been used in breast enhancement surgery procedures in South America. More specifically, in some cases of breast augmentation via the polypropylene method, the breasts may grow at different paces and usually at sometimes dangerously accelerated rates. In her case, they have grown in unison, but their growth rate has steadily slowed over the years. The initial string content was equivalent to 2500cc. Her doctor estimates the growth has increased the size of each breast to over 15,000cc as of October 2011. She stated on her website news/blog and FAQ that number had increased to 18,000cc as of summer 2014 and then increased to 21,000 cc as of December 2014.

Charms was a subject for British artist Marc Quinn's body of work on people who manipulate their bodies.

Citing health issues and the inability to travel, Chelsea Charms retired from the Adult industry and underwent a breast reduction in 2020.

References

External links 
 
 

1976 births
Living people
People from the Minneapolis–Saint Paul metropolitan area
American female adult models
Pornographic film actors from Minnesota
People known for their body modification
American pornographic film actresses
21st-century American women